The Los Angeles Herald-Express was one of Los Angeles' oldest newspapers, formed after a combination of the Los Angeles Herald and the Los Angeles Express. After a 1962 combination with Hearst Corporation's Los Angeles Examiner, the paper became the Los Angeles Herald-Examiner folding on November 2, 1989.

History

Los Angeles Express

The Los Angeles Express was Los Angeles's oldest newspaper published under its original name until it combined with the Herald. It was established on March 27, 1871

Los Angeles Herald

Established in 1873, the Los Angeles Herald or the Evening Herald represented the largely Democratic views of the city and focused primarily on issues local to Los Angeles and Southern California. The Los Angeles Daily Herald was first published on October 2, 1873, by Charles A. Storke. It was the first newspaper in Southern California to use the innovative steam press; the newspaper's offices at 125 South Broadway were popular with the public because large windows on the ground floor allowed passersby to see the presses in motion. In 1922, the Herald officially joined the Hearst News empire.

Los Angeles Herald-Express
In 1931, Hearst merged the Los Angeles Daily Herald with the Los Angeles Evening Express to form the Los Angeles Evening Herald and Express, which was then the largest circulating evening newspaper west of the Mississippi.

Los Angeles Herald Examiner

The Los Angeles Herald Examiner was a major Los Angeles daily newspaper, published in the afternoon from Monday to Friday and in the morning on Saturdays and Sundays. It was part of the Hearst syndicate. The afternoon Herald-Express and the morning Examiner, both of which had been publishing in the city since the turn of the 20th century, merged in 1962. For a few years after this merger, the Herald Examiner claimed the largest afternoon-newspaper circulation in the country.

It published its last edition on November 2, 1989.

Notable people

 Samuel Travers Clover, became editor of the Express in 1902.
 John Tracy Gaffey, first editor of the Los Angeles Herald
 C.H. Garrigues, writer
 Grace Kingsley, feature writer
 Dave Stannard, Los Angeles City Council member, 1942–43
 William Ivan "Ike" St. Johns and Adela Rogers St. Johns, a popular husband-and-wife reporting team, were among the notable Herald staff in the early years.
 John Kenneth Turner, muckraker
 William J. Harrison, Circulation Director

References

External links
 
 Digital archive of the Los Angeles Herald at the California Newspaper Collection

Hearst Communications publications
Herald Express